Laugh India Laugh, a.k.a. L.I.L. is a stand-up comedy competition aired on Life OK channel. Top 18 Contestants from India and Pakistan will be selected after auditions.

Host 
 Ishita Sarkar

Judges 
 Mika Singh
 Shekhar Suman
 Chunky Pandey

Contestants 
Akhtar Hindustani, Ali Javed, Amit Sharma, Ashok Nagar, Ayaz Samoo, Chirag Jain, Chirag Wadhwani, Dinesh Bawara, Dr Sanket, Kainaat Chouhan, Kesar Dev, KT, Laxman Nepali, Manoj Gujjar, Naseem Vicky, Nitesh Gupta, Rahul Rajasthani, Rajiv Goldy, Sardar Kamaal and Badar Khan, Sumedh Shinde, Sunil Vyas, Surindar Angural, Tahir Ali.

Winner
 from Pakistan won the Laugh India Laugh finale, which was telecast on 30 September 2012. KT from Mumbai is Runner up & Kesar Dev Marwari is 2nd Runner up.

References

Indian drama television series
Indian reality television series
Indian stand-up comedy television series
2012 Indian television series debuts
2012 Indian television series endings
Life OK original programming